is a professional Japanese baseball player. He plays infielder for the Yokohama DeNA BayStars.

External links

 NPB.com

1991 births
Living people
Baseball people from Kanagawa Prefecture
Japanese baseball players
Nippon Professional Baseball infielders
Yokohama DeNA BayStars players
Asian Games medalists in baseball
Baseball players at the 2014 Asian Games
Medalists at the 2014 Asian Games
Asian Games bronze medalists for Japan